Mr. Garagasa  is a 2008 Kannada-language comedy film in Sandalwood directed by Dinesh Baboo and starring Komal. The film is based on 1998 French comedy Le Dîner de Cons (also known as The Dinner Game).

Cast

Komal Kumar as Muniya (Mr Garagasa)

Anant Nag as Parthasarthy

Aishwarya as Madhavi

Lakshmi Hegde as Teju

T. S. Nagabharana as Sharat

Sudha Rani as Gouri

Ramesh Bhat as Dr Karanth

Vanishri as Mandakini

Pavithra Lokesh

Pawan Kumar

Plot
Muniya wants his movie script to be made into a film, so he comes to Bangalore with the script in his briefcase. He finds Parthasarthy, a film producer, but Muniya has a hard time convincing Parthasarathy that his story is good enough.

This is a remake of a French film called Diner de cons and similar to the Hindi movie Bheja fry

Music

The movie contains only one melodious track.

Remakes/Inspirations

Critical reception
Indiaglitz called it a "time pass cinema". Sify wrote: "The whole film leaves an impression of watching a stage play. Concentration is given more for dialogues".

References

Indian remakes of French films
Films set in Bangalore
2008 films
2000s Kannada-language films
Films directed by Dinesh Baboo